Pavelló Menorca (Pabellón Menorca in Spanish) is an arena in Menorca in the area of Binitaufa, Mahón, Spain.  It is primarily used for basketball and the home arena of Menorca Bàsquet. The arena holds 5,115 people and was built in a record time of 100 days in 2005.

External links
Location in Google Maps

Indoor arenas in Spain
Menorca Bàsquet
Basketball venues in Spain
Sports venues in the Balearic Islands
Mahón
Sport in Menorca